The Nigerian Armed Forces (NAF) are the combined military forces of Nigeria. It consists of three uniformed service branches: the Nigerian Army, Nigerian Navy, and Nigerian Air Force. The President of Nigeria functions as the commander-in-chief of the armed forces, exercising his constitutional authority through the Ministry of Defence, which is responsible for the management of the military and its personnel. The operational head of the AFN is the Chief of the Defence Staff, who is subordinate to the Nigerian Defence Minister. The National Defence Council has been in existence since 1979 and advises the President on matters relating to the armed forces. The NDC is chaired by the president, and its members include the Vice President of Nigeria, the Minister of Defence, the Chief of Defence Staff, the Chief of Army Staff, the Chief of Naval Staff and the Chief of Air Staff, as well as others the president is empowered to appoint. With a force of more than 230,000 active personnel, the Nigerian military is one of the largest uniformed combat services in Africa. According to Global Firepower, the Nigerian Armed Forces are the fourth-most powerful military in Africa, and ranked 35th on its list, internationally.

The Nigerian Armed Forces were established in 1960 as the successor to the combat units of the Royal West African Frontier Force stationed in the country, which had previously served as the British Empire's multi-battalion field force, during Nigeria's protectorate period. Shortly after its formation, the NAF was engaged in combat operations against the secessionist state of Biafra, during the Nigerian Civil War from 1967 to 1970. At this point in time, the Nigerian military ballooned in strength from 85,000 personnel in 1967, to more than 250,000 troops by the war's end. In the years following the civil war, the Nigerian Armed Forces were halved in size from its post-war height to approximately 125,000 men. In spite of this contraction in the size and funding of its Armed Forces, Nigeria would boast the only military in West Africa capable of engaging in foreign military operations, such as during its intervention in Liberian civil war in 1990. Nigeria's Armed Forces would continue to remain an active element in combat operations throughout the African continent over the proceeding decades, with bobs 
notable engagements including its 2017 involvement as part of the ECOWAS military intervention in the Gambia.

Today, the NAF faces a number of domestic challenges which continue to undermine stability within Nigeria and the region as a whole. Some of these threats include the ongoing conflict against the jihadist rebel group, Boko Haram in northeastern Nigeria, which has been in effect since July 2009. Likewise, Nigeria has been engaged in a long-running anti-piracy campaign in the Niger Delta, which has threatened the vital petroleum industry in the country, which is the source of 90% of Nigeria's exports and 35% of the government's revenue. Compounding this state of affairs is the role corruption plays in the ongoing attempts to strengthen the armed forces. Corruption has historically weakened the Nigerian military's capacity to face internal security threats, and is cited as being responsible for the continued longevity of rebels and terrorists operating throughout the nation.

In spite of these challenges to its operational readiness, the Nigerian Armed Forces have committed to a number of wide-ranging modernization programs to bolster the discipline and firepower of its troops. This includes the acquisition of new armored vehicles, combat aircraft and aerial reconnaissance drones, and the refurbishing of naval vessels, which had suffered from a prolonged periods of poor or minimal maintenance. These trends in the development of the armed forces as a fighting force, as well as efforts to combat corruption within the ranks of military personnel and government bureaucracy, have been critically important in the ability of Nigeria to confront challenges to its national security and stability in the wider region of West Africa as a whole.

History
The origin of the Nigerian Armed Forces lies in the elements of the Royal West African Frontier Force, that became Nigerian, when independence was granted in 1960. In 1956, the Nigeria Regiment of the Royal West African Frontier Force (RWAFF) was renamed the Nigerian Military Forces, RWAFF, and in April 1958, the colonial government of Nigeria took over from the British War Office control of the Nigerian Military Forces.

Since its creation, the Nigerian military has fought in a civil war – the conflict with Biafra in 1967–70 – and sent peacekeeping forces abroad, both with the United Nations and as the backbone of the Economic Community of West African States (ECOWAS) Cease-fire Monitoring Group (ECOMOG) in Liberia and Sierra Leone. It has also seized power twice at home (1966 & 1983).

The great expansion of the military during the civil war further entrenched the existing military hold on Nigerian society, carried over from the first military regime. In doing so, it played an appreciable part in reinforcing the military's nearly first-among-equals status within Nigerian society, and the linked decline in military effectiveness. Olusegun Obasanjo, who by 1999, had become president, bemoaned the fact in his inaugural address that year: "... Professionalism has been lost... my heart bleeds to see the degradation in the proficiency of the military."

Training establishments in Nigeria include the prestigious officer entry: Nigerian Defence Academy at Kaduna, the Armed Forces Command and Staff College, Jaji, and the National War College at Abuja. The U.S. commercial military contractor, Military Professional Resources Inc. has been involved around 1999–2000 in advising on civil-military relations for the armed forces.

Legal standing
The roles of a country's armed forces are entrenched in her constitution. The defence of the territorial integrity and other core interests of the nation, form the major substance of such roles. Section 217-220 of the 1999 Constitution of Nigeria thus addresses the Nigerian Armed Forces:
(1) There shall be an armed forces for the federation, which shall consist of an army, a navy, an air force, and such other branches of the armed forces of the federation, as may be established by an Act of the National Assembly.
(2) The federation shall, subject to an Act of the National Assembly made in that behalf, equip and maintain the armed forces as may be considered adequate and effective for the purpose of –
(a) defending Nigeria from external aggression.
(b) maintaining its territorial integrity and securing its borders from violation on land, sea, or air;
(c) suppress insurrection and act in aid of civil authorities to restore order, when called upon to do so by the President, but subject to such conditions as may be prescribed by an Act of the National Assembly; and
(d) perform such other functions as may be prescribed by an act of the National Assembly.
(3) The composition of the officer corps and other ranks of the armed forces of the Federation shall reflect the federal character of Nigeria.

Army

The Nigerian Army (NA) is the land branch of the Nigerian Armed Forces and the largest among the armed forces. Its major formations include the 1st Division, 2nd Division, 3rd Armoured Division, 81st Division, 82nd Division and the newly formed 8th, 7th and 6th Divisions. The Nigerian army is headed currently by Major General Farouk Yahaya, who was appointed by President Muhammadu Buhari. The Nigerian Army  has been playing a major role in defence of Nigerian Democracy since the first republic till date.

Navy

The Nigerian Navy (NN) is the sea branch of the Nigerian Armed Forces. The Nigerian Navy command structure today, consists of the Naval Headquarters in Abuja as well as three other operational commands with headquarters in Lagos, Calabar and Bayelsa. The training command headquarters are located in Lagos, the commercial capital of Nigeria, but with training facilities spread all over Nigeria. There are five operational bases; five forward operational bases (with two more soon to come on stream), two dockyards located in Lagos and Port Harcourt and two fleets based in Lagos and Calabar. The Nigerian Navy is currently headed by Vice Admiral Awwal Zubairu Gambo.

Air Force

The Nigerian Air Force was formally established in January 1964, with technical assistance from West Germany. The Air Force started as a transport unit, with the aircrew being trained in Canada, Ethiopia and Pakistan. The Air Force did not get a combat capability until a number of MiG-17 aircraft were presented by the Soviet Union in 1966.

In 2007, the Air Force had a strength of 10,000. It flies transport, trainer, helicopter, and fighter aircraft.
By 2021, the number of the Air Force personnel had increased to 18,000.

The Air Force sponsors the Air Force Military School, Jos, Nigeria and the Air Force Institute of Technology. Nigeria also has pursued a policy of developing domestic training and military production capabilities. Nigeria has continued a strict policy of diversification in her military procurement from various countries. The Nigerian Air force is currently headed by Air Marshal Isiaka Oladayo Amao.

Other components
There is a Joint Task Force in the Niger Delta region designated-- "Restore Hope". This is an inter-service Operational Team, comprising members of the army, navy, and air force to combat terrorism in the Niger Delta. JTF HQ is located at Yenagoa. The current head of the Joint Task Force in Niger Delta is Rear Admiral Akinjide Akinrinade.

Nigerian military forces abroad

In December 1983, the new Major General Muhammadu Buhari regime announced that Nigeria could no longer afford an activist anti-colonial role in Africa. Anglophone ECOWAS members established ECOMOG, dominated by the Nigerian Army in 1990, to intervene in the civil war in Liberia. The Army has demonstrated its capability to mobilize, deploy, and sustain brigade-sized forces in support of peacekeeping operations in Liberia. Smaller army forces have been previously sent on UN and ECOWAS deployments in the former Yugoslavia, Guinea-Bissau, and Sierra Leone. This doctrine of African military intervention by Nigeria is sometimes called Pax Nigeriana.

That policy statement did not deter Nigeria under Generals Ibrahim Babangida in 1990 and Sani Abacha in 1997, from sending ECOMOG peacekeeping forces under the auspices of ECOWAS into Liberia and later Sierra Leone, when the civil wars broke out in those countries. President Olusegun Obasanjo in August 2003, committed the Nigerian troops once again into Liberia, at the appeal of the United States, to provide an interim presence until the United Nations Mission in Liberia (UNMIL) arrived. Charles Taylor was subsequently eased out of power and exiled to Nigeria.

In October 2004, the Nigerian troops were deployed to Darfur, Sudan, to spearhead an African Union force, to stop the genocide in Darfur. Nigeria has contributed more than 20,000 troops/police to various UN missions since 1960. The Nigerian Police Force and troops have participated in:

 UNIPOM – India and Pakistan, 1965
 UNIFIL – Lebanon, 1978 
 UNIIMOG – Iran and Iraq, 1988 
 UNPROFOR – Former Yugoslavia, 1998 
 UNMISET – East Timor, 1999 
 MONUC – Democratic Republic of the Congo, 2004

Nigerian officers have served as Chiefs of Defence in other countries, with Brigadier General Maxwell Khobe, serving as Sierra Leone Chief of Staff in 1998–1999, and Nigerian officers acting as Command Officer-in-Charge of the Armed Forces of Liberia from at least, 2007.

References

List of Military Health Care Facilities Under DHML – for unit locations
Military Ranks of the Nigerian Army Military Ranks of the Nigerian Army

Further reading

Idang, Gordon J. "The Politics of Nigerian Foreign Policy: The Ratification and Renunciation of the Anglo-Nigerian Defence Agreement." African Studies Review 13, no. 2 (1970): 227–251.
Robin Luckham, The Nigerian military; a sociological analysis of authority & revolt 1960–67, Cambridge [Eng.] University Press, 1971.
N.J. Miners, ‘The Nigerian Army 1956–66,’ Methuen and Co. Ltd, London, 1971
Jimi Peters, 'The Nigerian Military and the State,' 1997, 
Nigerian Army Education Corps and School, History of the Nigerian Army 1863–1992, Abuja, 1992

External links 
 Nigerian Defence Staff
 Nigerian Army
 Nigerian Navy
 Nigerian Air Force